Chai Nam is a tambon (subdistrict) of Wang Thong District, in Phitsanulok Province, Thailand. In 2019 it had a total population of 6,267 people.

Geography
Chai Nam lies in the Nan Basin, part of the Chao Phraya Watershed.

Administration

Central administration
The tambon is subdivided into 9 administrative villages (muban).

Local administration
The whole area of the subdistrict is covered by the subdistrict administrative organization (SAO) Chai Nam (องค์การบริหารส่วนตำบลชัยนาม).

Temples
The following is a list of Buddhist temples in the Chai Nam Sub-district:
Wat Nen Noi (วัดเณรน้อย), also known as Wat Bueng Phrao (วัดบึงพร้าว) in muban 3
Wat Chai Nam (วัดไชยนาม) in muban 1
Wat Ko Kaeo Prachanurak (วัดเกาะแก้วประชานุรักษ์) in muban 2

References

External links
Thaitambon.com on Chai Nam 
Chai Nam subdistrict administrative organization

Tambon of Phitsanulok province
Populated places in Phitsanulok province